Heart is the debut album of artist Yuna Ito, released on January 24, 2007. It comes in a CD version, and a limited CD+DVD Version, that includes a 32-special-page-booklet and music videos. Heart debuted at number 1 on the Oricon Weekly Charts for Japan.

Track listing 
"Workaholic"
"Endless Story" (Nana Movie Theme)
"Losin'" (AXN's Lost - Season 2 - Theme)
"Know-how"
"Precious"　(Limit of Love - Umizaru - Movie Theme)
"Tender Is the Night"
"Fragile"
"Nobody Knows"
"Faith"　(KTV CX's Drama Unfair title theme)
"Stay for Love"
"Truth" (Nana2 Movie Theme)
"Perfume"

Bonus tracks:
"Precious" (wedding extended ver.)

Limited DVD edition
"Truth" (original version)
"Stuck on You"
"Faith"
"Losin'"
"Precious" (Special Version)
"Endless Story" (The Memories)

Sales

Oricon Sales Chart (Japan)

Singles

References

External links
Yuna Ito's official site
Special Heart Interview for Trivia text
Oricon Style Site

2007 debut albums
Yuna Ito albums